Chae Young-in (born Bae Young-seon; August 28, 1982) is a South Korean singer and actress.

Career
She debuted in the entertainment industry since 2000 through the Super Elite model contest. She was the leader of the former South Korean girl group  which was active from 2005 to 2006. In August 2006, she debuted as a solo singer but the audience reaction was not good. Since 2007, she has focused to the acting career and is currently active. In 2008, she won "New Star Award" on 2008 SBS Drama Awards thanks to her role "Min So-hee" in drama Temptation of Wife.

Personal life
Chae Young-in married her boyfriend who is a dermatologist on November 24, 2012. Their daughter Kim So-yool was born in April 2015. Chae Young-in and her daughter have shortly appeared on episode 296 of SBS's variety show Running Man.

Filmography

Television series

Film

Variety show

Awards and nominations

References

External links

Chae Young-in at Daum 
Chae Young-in at Naver Movies 

South Korean film actresses
South Korean television actresses
South Korean television personalities
Living people
1982 births
Kyonggi University alumni
21st-century South Korean actresses